Ma and Pa Kettle at the Fair is a 1952 American comedy film directed by Charles Barton. It is the fourth installment of Universal-International's Ma and Pa Kettle series, starring Marjorie Main and Percy Kilbride.

Plot

Ma and Pa Kettle are trying to raise money to send their daughter Rosie to college, although the couple are unemployed and in debt.  Pa deliberately walks in front of street traffic, hoping to win a monetary injury settlement, but only succeeds in causing a collision. Ma then decides to participate in contests at the county fair, and Pa buys Emma, an old tired horse, on credit for the Harness Race, promising to pay the owner later with Ma's fair prize winnings. Birdie Hicks tries her best to win all the contests, but the Kettles are the ones who get the last laugh.

Cast
Marjorie Main as Ma Kettle
Percy Kilbride as Pa Kettle
Lori Nelson as Rosie Kettle
James Best as Marvin Johnson
Esther Dale as Birdie Hicks
Emory Parnell as Billy Reed
Russell Simpson as Clem Johnson
Rex Lease as Sheriff

References

External links

1952 films
American comedy films
American horse racing films
Ma and Pa Kettle
1952 comedy films
Films set in Washington (state)
American black-and-white films
1950s English-language films
Films directed by Charles Barton
1950s American films